"I Love You" (알러뷰) is a song recorded by South Korean girl group EXID. It was released as a single on November 21, 2018, by Banana Culture and distributed by Sony Music. A music video for the song was also released on November 21. This marks the return of member Solji after a hiatus from the group due to health issues.

Release 
The song was released as a digital single on November 21, 2018, through several music portals, including MelOn and iTunes. A CD single was released a day later in South Korea.

Composition 
The song is written and produced by Shinsadong Tiger and member LE.

Commercial performance 
"I Love You" debuted at number 61 on the Gaon Digital Chart and at number 7 on the Gaon Album Chart, for the week ending November 24, 2018. It also debuted at number 65 on Billboard Koreas Kpop Hot 100 for the week of November 25. In its second week, the song peaked at number 29 on Gaon and at number 21 on the Hot 100.

The song also entered Billboard's World Digital Songs Sales chart at number 5, earning the group's first Top 5 on the chart, with 1,000 downloads sold in the week ending November 22.

The physical copy of the single was the 25th best-selling album of November 2018, with 14,777 copies sold.

Track listing

Charts

References 

EXID
EXID songs
2018 singles
2018 songs
Songs written by Shinsadong Tiger